"Illusions in G Major" is a song recorded by Electric Light Orchestra (ELO) and is track eight on the band's highly acclaimed 1974 album Eldorado.

It was used as the B-side to the popular hit "Can't Get It Out of My Head", a 1975 hit in the United States. The song clocks in at 2:37, making it one of the shortest on the album. The theme of the song is about a rock star talking to his psychiatrist about his mysterious visions, he even mentions "I heard the crew a hummin' tunes that sounded like The Rolling Stones and Leonard Cohen", then also "I heard the pilot saying, poems that were written by John Keats and Robert Browning". It was remastered and included in 2000 by Jeff Lynne on the box set compilation Flashback.

References

Song recordings produced by Jeff Lynne
Electric Light Orchestra songs
1974 songs
Songs written by Jeff Lynne
Songs about music
United Artists Records singles
Warner Records singles